The Minister of Tourism (Italian: Ministro del Turismo), whose official name is Minister for the Coordination of Initiatives in the Tourism Sector, is one of the positions in the Italian government. The office, known as Minister of Tourism and Entertainment and established in 1959, was later abolished in 1993 after a referendum. It was however re-established in 2009 under the government of Silvio Berlusconi.

The current Minister of Tourism is Daniela Santanchè, who is serving since 22 October 2022.

List of Ministers
Parties
 

 

Coalitions

References

Tourism
Tourism in Italy